Two things are identical if they are the same, see Identity (philosophy).

Identical may also refer to:
 Identical (Hopkins novel), a 2008 young adult novel by Ellen Hopkins
 Identical (Turow novel), a 2013 legal drama novel by Scott Turow
 The Identical, a 2014 American musical drama film
 Mathematically identical
  Identical (2011 film)
 Identical (musical), a 2022 stage musical

See also
 Identity (disambiguation)
 Identical particles, particles that cannot be distinguished from one another
 Identical twins, two offspring resulting from the same pregnancy in which a single egg is fertilized